Davao Prison and Penal Farm, formerly the Davao Penal Colony (DaPeCol), was established on January 21, 1932 in Panabo City, Davao del Norte, Philippines. It has a land area of 30,000 hectares with a prison reservation of 8,000 hectares.  During World War II, the Davao Penal Colony was the biggest prison establishment in the country which was used by the Japanese invading army as their imperial garrison.

History

On October 7, 1931, Governor Dwight Davis signed proclamation 414 which reserved a site for Penal Colony in Davao Province in Mindanao and on January 21, 1932 the Davao Penal Colony was formally established under Act No. 3732. During World War II, it was used by the Philippine-American Armed Forces where more than 1000 Japanese were treated in accordance with the orders of the American commanding officer. The Japanese Imperial Army attacked Davao on December 20, 1941 and the colony was among the establishments that were taken over by the Imperial Army.

American POW camp

Two thousand American prisoners were held in the penal colony after Japan's conquest of the Philippines in World War II.  Some of the prisoners, survivors of the Bataan Death March, escaped in Spring 1943. When the twelve men escaped, later joining Wendell Fertig's guerrillas, the Japanese beheaded twenty-five prisoners.  Major Stephen Mellnik, of Douglas MacArthur's South West Pacific Area (command), inserted the M1 S-X intelligence officer Capt. Harold Rosenquist into Mindanao in an attempt to rescue the Americans before they could be moved.  However, the Japanese had already evacuated the camp, placing the American prisoners on a ship bound for Japan.  However, that ship was sunk by an American submarine, and only eighty-three reached shore and were rescued by guerrillas.

See also
 1989 Davao hostage crisis
 William Dyess
 Jack Hawkins
 Samuel Grashio
 Austin Shofner

References

Japanese prisoner of war and internment camps
Buildings and structures in Davao del Norte
Prisons in the Philippines